Utinga is a train station on CPTM Line 10-Turquoise, located in the district of Utinga, city of Santo André.

History
In April 1932, São Paulo Railway announced the construction of Utinga station to attend the homonymous neighbourhood in Santo André. On 1 August 1933, the station was opened. In mid-1960, a new building was built to attend the growing demand.

The station was transferred from the federal administration (CBTU) to the state administration (CPTM) on 1 June 1994. In 2000, a small group, composed mostly by gypsies, invaded an area next to the station, originating Utinga favela. With the time, the number of robberies in the station's surroundings and in its facilities and trains raised, and the perpetrators looked for refuge in the favela's alleys.

Projects
On 11 May 2005, the consortium composed by Maubertec and Herjack companies was hired by CPTM by the cost of 845,974 BRL ( USD) - with additives, the cost of the contract was of 888,036.85 BRL ( USD) to make projects of rebuilt for stations Mooca, Ipiranga, Utinga and Prefeito Saladino. On 29 March 2008, the projects were delivered. CPTM signed them up in the Growth Acceleration Program (PAC), being contemplated in the pre-selection phase. With the 2014 economic crisis, many PAC financings were cancelled, including the reconstruction of the stations.

Toponymy
The term Utinga comes from the Tupi language, which means "white water", through the junction of the terms y (water) and ting (white).

References

Companhia Paulista de Trens Metropolitanos stations
Railway stations opened in 1933
Railway stations opened in 1960